FC Neftyanik Buguruslan is an association football team from Buguruslan, Russia. It played professionally from 1994 to 1999. Their best result was 16th place in Zone Privolzhye of the Russian Second Division in 1998 and 1999.

Team name and location history
1993–1999: FC Neftyanik Pokhvistnevo
2000: FC Sputnik Buguruslan
2001–present: FC Neftyanik Buguruslan

External links
 Team history at KLISF

Football clubs in Russia
Sport in Orenburg Oblast